Altered State was a progressive rock band based in Huntington Beach, CA. Influenced by Pink Floyd, Rush, Led Zeppelin and U2. Altered State has been described as "an inventive band with unique arrangements, melodic vocals and great harmonies."

History
Altered State was formed in 1990 in Huntington Beach, CA by vocalist/guitarist Gregory Markel, drummer Chip Moreland and guitarist Curtis Mathewson, previously performing together in the band Show of Hands. In 1990, Altered State signed with Warner Bros. Records

1991 the band released their eponymous debut album and the first single, Step Into My Groove. The 1992 single Ghost Beside My Bed, went #1 at Rock Radio in several states in the U.S. It was the most requested song on KQLZ Pirate Radio, the station set up a special show for the band at The Roxy in Hollywood, CA. Gregory Markel's performance that night is highlighted in Vicki Hamilton's book Appetite for Dysfunction: A Cautionary Tale.

In 1993 the band released :[dos]:.

Members
Gregory Markel - Lead vocals, guitar (1990–1995)
Chip Moreland - drums, vocals,(1990–1995)
Curtis Mathewson - Guitar, vocals, keyboards (1990–1994)
Riz Story - Bass (Debut tour) (1991-1992)
Paul Edwards - Bass (1992 - 1994)

Discography
Altered State (August 27, 1991)
:[dos]: (October 5, 1993)

Singles

 "Step Into My Groove" (1991)
 "Step Into My Groove" -Psychedelic Mix & Psychedelic Instrumental (1991) 
 "Ghost Beside My Bed" (1992)
 "Strong As I Am"/"Strong As I Am" -Acoustic (1993)
 "Life on a Skateboard" (1994)
 "Darkness Visible" (1994)

Videos

 "Step Into My Groove" (1991)
 "Telemusica: Altered State Step Into My Groove interview" (1991)
 "Can You Hear My Voice" -1988 Rough Demo/Band Footage (2013)
 "Ghost Beside My Bed" 20th Anniversary Video Interview (2014)

Demos/Live Releases

 "Made of Gasoline" -1992 Rough Demo (1993)
 "End Summer" -1992 Rough Demo (2012)
 "Can You Hear My Voice" -1988 Rough Demo (2012)
 "Hyper-Violence" -1992 4 Track Demo (2012)
 "Walkin' With The Wounded" -Home Rough Sketch Demo (2014)
 "Until The Music Ends" -WLLZ Live from The Magic Bag 1992 (2015)

Songs covered by other artists

 Lane Lane (2000) - Ballad Collection II  and Ballad Collection Special Edition - "Ghost Beside My Bed"
 Divinorum (2006) - Ravensong - "Life on a Skateboard"
 Rusty Anderson/Gregory Markel (2005) - Live OC Pavillion - "Ghost Beside My Bed"

References

External links
alteredstate.com

Rock music groups from California